Rantzausminde is a town located on the island of Funen in south-central Denmark, in Svendborg Municipality.

References 

Cities and towns in the Region of Southern Denmark
Svendborg Municipality